Cheshmeh Ali-ye Kayedan (also Romanized as Cheshmeh ‘Alī-ye Kāyedān; also known as ‘Alīābād-e Kābedān, Chashmeh-i-‘Ali, Chashmeh-ye ‘Alī, Cheshmeh ‘Alī-ye Mūchegān, and Cheshmeh-ye ‘Alī) is a village in Jahangiri Rural District, in the Central District of Masjed Soleyman County, Khuzestan Province, Iran. At the 2006 census, its population was 46, in 7 families.

References 

Populated places in Masjed Soleyman County